Artyom Olegovich Meshchaninov (born 19 February 1996) is a Russian football player. He plays for PFC Sochi.

Club career
On 9 August 2019, he joined FC Baltika Kaliningrad on a season-long loan.

On 16 June 2022, Meshchaninov signed with Russian Premier League club PFC Sochi. He made his RPL debut for Sochi on 23 July 2022 against PFC CSKA Moscow.

Career statistics

References

External links
 
 

1996 births
People from Kolpino
Footballers from Saint Petersburg
Living people
Russian footballers
Association football defenders
FC Tosno players
FC Baník Ostrava players
1. SC Znojmo players
FC Baltika Kaliningrad players
PFC Sochi players
Czech First League players
Czech National Football League players
Russian First League players
Russian Premier League players
Russian expatriate footballers
Expatriate footballers in the Czech Republic
Russian expatriate sportspeople in the Czech Republic